Lucterius (Ancient Greek: Λυκτεριoς) was a leader of the Cadurci, a Celtic people whose territory was located around Cahors in the modern French department of Lot. In the 50s BC, the Cadurci were under the rule of the Arverni, the civitas of Vercingetorix, under whom Lucterius served during the last stages of the Gallic Wars. In his memoirs, Julius Caesar calls him a man of unsurpassed boldness.

During the Gallic rebellion of 52 BC, Vercingetorix placed part of his forces under the command of Lucterius and sent him to secure the allegiance of the Ruteni, a border people. Advancing through the territory of the Nitiobriges and Gabali, he amassed an impressive number of troops and was on the point of invading the Narbonensis, the Roman province of Mediterranean Gaul, when the arrival of Caesar and his army forced him to withdraw.

Lucterius remained at large after the surrender of Vercingetorix at Alesia and continued the resistance the following year in an alliance with Drappes, a Senonian under whom motley contingents of Gallic rebels had gathered. They attempted another invasion of the Narbonensis, but were blocked by Gaius Caninius Rebilus. They temporarily withdrew to the oppidum of Uxellodunum, in the French province of "le Quercy", though its exact location is still a matter of debate. Mindful of the fate of Vercingetorix under siege at Alesia, they found it imprudent to remain within walls, and encamped about 10 miles away. For a time they were able to keep the town provisioned with grain despite the Roman presence.

Despite the capture of Vercingetorix, Lucterius continued rebellion and guerrilla warfare in Gaul, coupled with the political situation in Rome, had put increasing pressure on Caesar as he neared the end of his legal term as proconsul. He thus joined the siege with the intention of making Uxellodunum an example of the consequences of resistance. When the town fell, Caesar spared the lives of those who had fought, but had their hands cut off as a visible reminder of the penalty for what he considered betrayal. Lucterius, having fled before the surrender, sought refuge among the Arverni, but was betrayed and turned over to the Romans.

Lucterius was the basis of the character Vitalstatistix from Asterix and Obelix.

References

1st-century BC rulers in Europe
Celts
Gaulish rulers